The Burning Heart is the fourth studio album by Swedish rock band Takida. The album entered the albums chart in Sweden on 5 August 2011 and topped it on 12 August 2011. By 27 January 2011, the album had stayed in the chart for 26 weeks. The album was certified gold according to the official Swedish chart website.

Track listing
 "Haven Stay"
 "Willow and Dead"
 "In the Water"
 "Was It I?"
 "Fire Away"
 "The Artist"
 "Ending Is Love"
 "The Fear "
 "The Burning Heart "
 "Silence Calls (You and I)"
 "It's My Life"
 "You Learn"

Charts

Weekly charts

Year-end charts

References

Takida albums
2011 albums